Olle Zetterquist (born 15 January 1927) is a Swedish artist and violinist. He was educated at the Valand Academy and became established in the Swedish artworld in the 1950s. He has often collaborated with his brother Jörgen Zetterquist, also an artist and musician. His works stretch from abstract organic painting to naturalism, with a focus on composition and colour values. Many of his subjects are from the nature around Arvika, where he is from. He is married to the artist Denice Zetterquist. Their daughter Nina Zetterquist is a textile artist.

References

1927 births
20th-century Swedish painters
21st-century Swedish painters
Living people
People from Arvika Municipality
Swedish contemporary artists
Swedish male painters
Swedish violinists
21st-century violinists
20th-century Swedish male artists
21st-century Swedish male artists